Minor International is a Thai multi-national company based in Bangkok, Thailand. The three core businesses of Minor are hospitality, restaurants and lifestyle brands distribution, operated under subsidiary companies Minor Hotels, Minor Food, and Minor Lifestyle respectively.

Minor Hotels is a hotel owner, operator and investor with a portfolio of 530 hotels and serviced suites under the Anantara, AVANI, Oaks, Tivoli, Elewana, NH Hotels, NH Collection, nhow Hotels, Four Seasons, St. Regis and Radisson Blu brands in 65 countries across Asia Pacific, the Middle East, Africa, the Indian Ocean, Europe and South America. 

Minor Food is one of Asia's largest restaurant companies with over 2,300 outlets operating system-wide in 27 countries under The Pizza Company, The Coffee Club, Thai Express, Riverside and Benihana brands, alongside franchise and joint-venture operations under the Swensen's, Sizzler, Dairy Queen, Burger King and BreadTalk brands.

Minor Lifestyle is one of the largest distributors of lifestyle brands in Thailand with a portfolio of international brands including Brooks Brothers, Esprit, Bossini, Etam, OVS, Radley, Anello, Charles & Keith, Pedro, Zwilling J.A. Henckels, Joseph Joseph and Minor Smart Kids, and a footprint of over 470 retail outlets.

History
Minor International was founded in 1978 as Royal Garden Resorts (RGR) with initial capital of three million baht. In late 2004, the company completed the acquisition of 100 percent of the Minor Food Group and followed this in January 2005 with its de-listing from the Stock Exchange of Thailand.

In 2006, Anantara entered Dubai at The Palm Jumeirah. In 2008, William Heinecke acquired 70 percent of Thai Express and 50 percent of The Coffee Club and 50 percent of Elewana Afrika for US$12 million. In 2008 he opened the Desert Islands Resort and Spa (Anantara) on Sir Bani Yas Island in Abu Dhabi.

On 12 June 2009, the company completed a business restructuring plan with Minor Corporation (MINOR). As a result, the company has directly and indirectly owned 99.92 percent of Minor's equity interest. On 22 June 2009, Minor was delisted from the Stock Exchange of Thailand.

In July 2011, MINT completed a compulsory acquisition and purchased most of the shares of Oaks Hotels and Resorts Limited, a listed company on the Australian Securities Exchange and doing Management Letting Right (MLR) business in Australia, New Zealand, and Dubai with a portfolio of 36 serviced suites under the "Oaks" brand.

Businesses
MINT operates three main businesses:
 Hotels and mixed use
 Restaurants
 Retail trading and contract manufacturing

Hotels and mixed use

MINT has 530 hotels and serviced suites with over 76,000 rooms in its portfolio. The hotel business can be divided into four categories:

 Owned hotels. MINT operates 27 wholly owned hotels.
 Joint venture hotels. Mint has partnerships in 25 hotels.
 Managed hotels. MINT manages 27 hotels.
 Management of serviced suites. MINT manages 47 properties in Australia, New Zealand, and Dubai.

Hotel-related businesses include:
 Spa business: MINT operates over 55 spas in leading hotels in 15 countries under the brands Anantara Spa, Mandara Spa and AvaniSpa.
 Plaza and entertainment business: MINT owns and operates three shopping plazas adjacent to its hotels. MINT also runs eight entertainment outlets at its Royal Garden Plaza in Pattaya.
 Residential property development business: MINT has two residential development projects, in Bangkok and Ko Samui.
 Points-based Vacation Club Project: First under the Anantara brand, Anantara Vacation Club is a collection of luxurious shared-ownership villas and apartments located in a variety of resort destinations for the use of its owners. Current properties include Koh Samui, Phuket, Chiang Mai, Bangkok, Bali, Queenstown - New Zealand, Sanya and Dubai.

Restaurants
Through its subsidiary, Minor Food Group PCL, MINT has one of the largest quick service restaurant operations in Asia, with over 2,300 restaurant outlets in Thailand, the Middle East, Asia, and Australia. In 2022, Minor bought London's Corbin & King restaurant group, removing founder Jeremy King.

Retail trading
MINT operates its retail trading and contract manufacturing business through Minor Corporation PCL, the group's consumer lifestyle company. Minor Corporation is a distributor of international lifestyle consumer brands in Thailand, focusing primarily on fashion, cosmetics, and household products through retail, wholesale, and direct marketing channels.

References

External links
Minor International website
Minor Hotels website
Minor Food website

 
 
 
 
 

 
Hospitality companies of Bangkok
Hospitality companies established in 1978
Companies listed on the Stock Exchange of Thailand
1978 establishments in Thailand
Hotel chains
Timeshare